Agortime-Kpetoe (also known simply as Kpetoe) is a small town and is the capital of Adaklu-Anyigbe District, a district in the Volta Region of Ghana.

Geography

Location
Agortime-Kpetoe lies about 23 kilometres south east of Ho, the regional capital.

References

External links and sources
Adaklu-Anyigbe District on GhanaDistricts.com
Kpetoe demographics

Populated places in the Volta Region